The Magar, also spelled as Mangar, and Mongar, are the third largest ethnolinguistic groups of Nepal, indigenous to Western Nepal and representing 7.1% of Nepal's total population according to the 2011 Nepal census.

External links 
 Farmers to millionaires
 Singur, look west at Magarpatta, the farmers’ township
 East is east
 Learning curves
 Should the state buy land for the private sector?
 Co-operative townships; the new mantra for farmers
 Eureka! Maharashtra farmers got IT

Marathi people
Social groups of Maharashtra